Rafael Valek Moure (18 December 1932 – 17 June 2013) was a Colombian footballer who played professionally in the Colombian Professional Football League, Serie A and Mexican Primera División.

Club career
Born in Bogotá, Valek signed for Independiente Santa Fe as the club won the first Fútbol Profesional Colombiano title in 1948. He joined rivals Millonarios where he played mostly as a reserve from 1948 to 1952. He would win four more Colombian league titles with Millonarios.

In 1953, Valek became the first Colombian to play professional football in Europe, although he signed as a Czechoslovak player through his parents' ancestry, with Italian Serie A side Genoa. Then, he would move to Mexico where he played for Oro, Celaya and Irapuato. In 1958, he finished his playing career with Cúcuta Deportivo.

Personal life
Valek died in Pasto, Colombia on 17 June 2013.
Valek was born in Bogota, Colombia on 18 December 1932.  He was one of 9 children of Czech father Jan Válek and Colombian María Cristina Moure Bello.  He was
brother of Colombian Captain Vladimir Valek Moure, who died during the Korean War on the 22 May 1951.
While Valek, as the rest of his siblings, was born in Colombia, later in his life he reclaimed his Czech nationality.  He was married three times and had 9 children.  6 live in Mexico, 2 live in Uruguay and 1 in Pasto.  For unknown reasons and a supposedly jealousy incident by his wife in Mexico and some political comments he made, he was deported from Mexico and banned for life.
He was never able to return and see his children which was the downfall of his professional career.  He married a second time, under complex situations.  After an argument
with his second wife, on revenge, she had him deported again from Uruguay with no chance to see his two boys ever again.  They grew estranged and separated.  He missed
his children to the last minute of his life and only reconciled with two of them from Mexico.  His Uruguayan son remains uninterested to this day about his father's past.

References

1932 births
2013 deaths
Colombian people of Czech descent
Footballers from Bogotá
Colombian footballers
Independiente Santa Fe footballers
Millonarios F.C. players
Genoa C.F.C. players
CD Oro footballers
Club Celaya footballers
Irapuato F.C. footballers
Cúcuta Deportivo footballers
Categoría Primera A players
Liga MX players
Colombian expatriate footballers
Expatriate footballers in Italy
Expatriate footballers in Mexico
Association football wingers